The National Routes of Uruguay (officially in Spanish, Rutas nacionales de Uruguay) are the most important transport routes in the country, linking all locations. It has a network of 8,698 km of which 303 km are with concrete, asphalt 3,164 km, 4,220 km bituminous and 1,009 km rough.

Route numbers

Types of routes 
The Ministry of Transport and Public Works classifies Uruguayan Routes as Corredor Internacional, Primary Network (Red Primaria), Secondary Network (Red Secundaria) and Tertiary Network (Red Terciaria).

Corredor Internacional 
Pathways linking Montevideo with the main points of departure from Uruguay.

 Route 1, all the way.
 Route 2,all the way.
 Route 3, all the way.
 Route 5, all the way.
 Route 8, from the beginning of Montevideo to Treinta y Tres.
 Route 9, all the way.

Primary network 
Pathways linking other department capitals.

 Route 6: the nearest stretch to Montevideo (80 km approximately).
 Route 7: the nearest stretch to Montevideo (100 km approximately).
 Route 8: from Treinta y Tres to Aceguá.
 Route 21: all the way.
 Route 24: all the way.
 Route 26: all the way.
 Route 30: from the junction with Route 5 to Artigas.
 Ruta Interbalnearia: all the way.

Secondary and tertiary networks 
Minor roads linking towns, some resorts or important agribusiness areas.

External links 
 MTPW website about the national route network 
 Routes of Uruguay
 National Routes of Uruguay, Viajando Por Uruguay
 Photos of the National Routes of Uruguay, via Picasa Web Albums